Ozur Toti was a 9th-century Norwegian hersir who lived in Halogaland. In the Heimskringla and Egil's Saga, he is identified as the father of Gunnhild Mother of Kings, the wife and queen of Erik Bloodaxe, though elsewhere she is identified as a daughter of Gorm the Old.

Heimskringla and Egil's Saga both assert that Gunnhild was Ozur's daughter. Accounts of her early life vary between sources. Egil's Saga relates that "Eirik fought a great battle on the Northern Dvina in Bjarmaland, and was victorious as the poems about him record. On the same expedition he obtained Gunnhild, the daughter of Ozur Toti, and brought her home with him." 

Egil's Saga names two sons of Ozur, and relates that they became hirdmen of Erik's.

Notes

References
Alen, Rupert  and Anna Marie Dahlquist. Royal Families of Medieval Scandinavia, Flanders, and Kiev. Kings River Publications, 1997.
Anderson, Poul. "Aftermath" (Historical note). Mother of Kings. Tor Books, 2003.
Ashley, Michael. The Mammoth Book of British Kings and Queens. Carroll & Graf Publishers, 1998.
Bradbury, Jim. The Routledge Companion to Medieval Warfare. Routledge, 2002.
Chantepie de la Saussaye, Pierre Daniël. The Religion of the Teutons. Bert J. Voss, trans. New York: Ginn & Co., 1902.
Driscoll, M. J., ed. Ágrip af Nóregskonungasǫgum. Viking Society for Northern Research, 1995. 
Finlay, Alison, ed./trans. Fagrskinna, a Catalogue of the Kings of Norway. Brill Academic Publishers, 2004. 
Forte, Angelo & Oram, Richard & Pedersen, Frederik. (2005). Viking Empires. Cambridge University Press. 
Fox, Denton. "Njals Saga and the Western Literary Tradition." Comparative Literature, Vol. 15, No. 4 (Autumn, 1963), p. 289–310.
Jones, Gwyn. A History of the Vikings. 2nd ed. London: Oxford Univ. Press, 1984.
Magnusson, Magnus, and Hermann Palsson, trans. Njal's Saga. Penguin Classics, 1960.
Ordower, Henry. "Exploring the Literary Function of Law and Litigation in 'Njal's Saga.'" Cardozo Studies in Law and Literature, Vol. 3, No. 1 (Spring – Summer 1991), pp. 41–61.
Orfield, Lester B. The Growth of Scandinavian Law. The Lawbook Exchange, Ltd., 2002.
Sturluson, Snorri. Heimskringla: History of the Kings of Norway Lee Hollander, trans. Univ. of Texas Press, 1991.
Theodoricus monachus (David and Ian McDougall, trans.; introduction by Peter Foote). The Ancient History of the Norwegian Kings. Viking Society for Northern Research, 1998. 
Thorsson, Örnólfur, et al., eds. "Egil's Saga". Bernard Scudder, trans. The Sagas of the Icelanders: a selection. Penguin Classics, 2000.
Tunstall, Peter, trans. The Tale of Ragnar's Sons. Northvegr, 2004.

9th-century Norwegian people